Chandra Das Rai (13 April 1924 - 8 August 2020) popularly known as C.D Rai was a politician of pre merger Sikkim, bureaucrat and former journalist. He was a senior leader in Sikkim State Congress.

Personal life

Chandra Das Rai was born on April 13, 1924 at Mikhola, South Sikkim. He completed his primary education at the local village school and then went to Darjeeling where he completed his secondary education from St. Robert's School in 1945. Former Member of Parliament Prem Das Rai is his son.

Career

Rai along with Tashi Tshering, Gobardhan Pradhan, DB Tiwari, DS Lepcha, Sonam Tshering, LD Kazi, Roy Choudhary and Helen Lepcha are among the founder members of the Sikkim State Congress. The Congress started agitation in February 1949 demanding the formation of an interim government and democratic reforms following which Rai and five others were arrested. This was followed by Congress supporters encircling the Palace on 1 May 1949. On 8 May 1949, he was made Minister for Education and Transport in the short lived ministry of the first CM of erstwhile Kingdom, Tashi Tshering. However the government was dismissed within 29 days by the Indian Political Officer Harishwar Dayal.

Other Works
In 1960, he became the Sikkim correspondent for Ananda Bazar Patrika. He also served as the first editor of Sikkim Herald. He was the editor of Himali Bela and Gangtok Times.

Awards
 2010- Kanchenjunga Kalam BBC Purashkar- Awarded by Press Club of Sikkim
 2014- Bhanu Purashkar- Awarded by Nepali Sahitya Parishad, Sikkim
 2018- Kashiraj Pradhan Lifetime Journalism Award- Presented by Government of Sikkim

References

 

People from Sikkim
Journalists from Sikkim
Sikkim politicians
1924 births
2020 deaths
Rai people